The Bang Na Expressway (full name: Bang Na - Bang Phli - Bang Pakong Expressway), officially Burapha Withi Expressway, is a  six-lane elevated highway in Thailand. It is a toll road and runs above National Highway route 34, (Bang Na–Trat Highway) owned by the Expressway Authority of Thailand (EXAT). The bridge was the achievement of Sukavich Rangsitpol deputy prime minister of Chuan Leekpai Cabinet (1992-1995). The Bang Na Expressway was designed by the late Louis Berger.

History 
The Bang Na Expressway was conceived by the Expressway and Rapid Transit Authority of Thailand (ETA). The structure was built using a design-build contracting method. The columns and superstructure were designed by Jean M. Muller (U.S.) and the alignment and foundations were designed by Asian Engineering Consultants (Thailand). The owner's engineer was Louis Berger Group (U.S.) and the project was built by a joint venture of Bilfinger & Berger (Germany) and Ch. Karnchang (Thailand). It took  of concrete to build the bridge. The bridge was completed in January 2000.

Records 
The world's longest car bridge, the Bang Na Expressway, held the title of the world's longest bridge from 2000 until 2008. Today, it is the seventh longest bridge in the world.

Structural description
It is a  box girder bridge.

There are two toll plazas on the elevated structure where the structure must widen to accommodate twelve lanes. The toll system is done by Kapsch TrafficCom AB (Sweden).

See also 
 List of bridges by length
 List of bridge megaprojects
 Expressway

References

External links 

 
The Bang Na Expressway (1,1 MB PDF-file with plans and photos)

Controlled-access highways in Thailand
Transport in Bangkok
Box girder bridges
Bridges completed in 2000
2000 establishments in Thailand